Durham University (legally the University of Durham) is a collegiate public research university in Durham, England, founded by an Act of Parliament in 1832 and incorporated by royal charter in 1837. It was the first recognised university to open in England for more than 600 years, after Oxford and Cambridge, and is thus, following standard historical practice in defining a university, the third-oldest university in England. As a collegiate university its main functions are divided between the academic departments of the university and its 17 colleges. In general, the departments perform research and provide teaching to students, while the colleges are responsible for their domestic arrangements and welfare.

The university is a member of the Russell Group of British research universities after previously being a member of the 1994 Group. Durham is also affiliated with the regional N8 Research Partnership and international university groups including the Matariki Network of Universities and the Coimbra Group. The university estate includes 83 listed buildings, ranging from the 11th-century Durham Castle to the 1960s brutalist students' union. The university also owns and manages the Durham World Heritage Site in partnership with Durham Cathedral. The university's ownership of the World Heritage Site includes Durham Castle, Palace Green, and the surrounding buildings including the historic Cosin's Library. It was Sunday Times University of the Year for 2005, and the Times and Sunday Times Sports University of the Year for 2015 and 2023, and was awarded a Queen's Anniversary Prize in 2018. Durham University Student Volunteering and Outreach was awarded the Queen's Award for Voluntary Service in 2020.

Current and emeritus academics include 14 Fellows of the Royal Society, 17 Fellows of the British Academy, 14 Fellows of the Academy of Social Sciences, 5 Fellows of the Royal Society of Edinburgh, 2 Fellows of the Royal Society of Arts and 2 Fellows of the Academy of Medical Sciences. Durham graduates have long used the Latin post-nominal letters Dunelm after their degree, from Dunelmensis (of, belonging to, or from Durham).

Among British universities, it had the ninth highest average UCAS Tariff for new entrants in 2019 and the third lowest proportion of state-school educated students starting courses in 2016, at 62.9 per cent (fifth lowest compared to its benchmark).

History

Origins

Between around 1286 and 1291 the Benedictine monks of Durham established a hall at Oxford University to provide them with a seat of learning. In 1381 this received an endowment from Thomas Hatfield, Bishop of Durham, becoming Durham College. Durham College was surrendered to the Crown in 1545 following the Reformation. The strong tradition of theological teaching in Durham gave rise to various attempts to form a university within the city itself, notably under King Henry VIII and then under Oliver Cromwell, who issued letters patent and nominated a proctor and fellows for the establishment of a college in 1657. The college was established, however, it was not allowed to confer degrees after petitioning by the Oxford and Cambridge Universities, unsettled by the idea of the formation of a rival institution. Regardless, the college closed soon after its establishment as a result of the restoration of the monarchy in 1660. Consequently, it was not until 1832 when Parliament, at the instigation of Archdeacon Charles Thorp and with the support of the Bishop of Durham, William van Mildert, passed "an Act to enable the Dean and Chapter of Durham Cathedral to appropriate part of the property of their church to the establishment of a University in connection therewith" that the university came into being. The act received Royal Assent from King William IV on 4 July 1832.

The church university, 1832–1909

The university opened on 28 October 1833. In 1834 all but two of the bishops of the Church of England confirmed that they would accept holders of Durham degrees for ordination. In 1835 a fundamental statute was passed by the Dean and Chapter, as governors of the university, setting up Convocation and laying down that Durham degrees would only be open to members of the Church of England. Regulations for degrees were finalised in 1836 and the university was incorporated by Royal Charter granted by William IV on 1 June 1837 as the "Warden, Masters and Scholars of the University of Durham", with the first students graduating a week later. Accommodation was provided in the Archdeacon's Inn (now Cosin's Hall) from 1833 to 1837. On the accession of Queen Victoria an order of the Queen-in-Council was issued granting the use of Durham Castle (previously a palace of the Bishop of Durham) to the university.

In 1846, Bishop Hatfield's Hall (later to become Hatfield College) was founded, providing the opportunity for students to obtain affordable lodgings with fully catered communal eating, a revolutionary idea at the time, endorsed by a Royal Commission in 1862 and later spread to other universities. Those attending University College were expected to bring a servant with them to deal with cooking, cleaning and so on. The level of applications to Bishop Hatfield's Hall led to a second hall along similar lines, Bishop Cosin's Hall, being founded in 1851, although this only survived until 1864. Elsewhere, the university expanded from Durham into Newcastle in 1852 when the medical school there (established in 1834) became a college of the university. This was joined in 1871 by the College of Physical Sciences (renamed the College of Science in 1884 and again renamed Armstrong College in 1904). St Cuthbert's Society was founded in 1888 for non-collegiate, mostly mature, male students as a non-residential society run by the students themselves. Two teacher-training colleges – St Hild's for women, established in 1858, and The College of the Venerable Bede for men, established in 1839, also existed in the city and these merged to form the mixed College of St Hild and St Bede in 1975. From 1896 these were associated with the university and graduates of St Hild's were the first female graduates from Durham in 1898.

During its expansion phase the university also became the first English university to establish relationships with overseas institutions; firstly in 1875 with Codrington College, Barbados, and secondly in early 1876 with Fourah Bay College, Sierra Leone. Under the arrangements the two colleges became affiliated colleges of the university with their students sitting examinations for and receiving Durham degrees. The landmark event was not met with universal applause, with the London Times stating "it would not be much longer before the University of Durham was affiliated to the Zoo". After nearly a century of affiliation and with the prevailing winds of decolonisation Fourah Bay became independent of the university in 1968 to form part of the University of Sierra Leone, while Codrington College retained its affiliation with the university until the 2000s.

The first debating society in Durham was founded in 1835, but may have closed by 1839. The Durham University Union was established in 1842, and revived and moved to Palace Green in 1872-3 as the Durham Union Society. Notable past presidents of the Durham Union have included Richard Dannatt, Sir Edward Leigh, and Crispin Blunt.

The Durham Colleges Students Representative Council (SRC) was founded around 1900 after the model of the College of Medicine SRC (in Newcastle). The Durham University SRC was formed in 1907 with representatives from the Durham Colleges, the College of Medicine, and Armstrong College (also in Newcastle). In 1963, after the creation of Newcastle University, the Durham Colleges SRC became the Durham University SRC, and was renamed as the Durham Students' Union in 1970.

Until the mid 19th century, University of Durham degrees were subject to a religion test and could only be taken by members of the established church. Medical degrees in Newcastle were exempt from this requirement from the start of the affiliation of the medical school, but in Durham it lasted until the revision of the statutes in 1865. Despite the opening of degrees, staff and members of Convocation were still required to be members of the Church of England until the Universities Tests Act 1871. However, "dissenters" were able to attend Durham and then sit the examinations for degrees of the University of London, which were not subject to any religious test. Following the grant of a supplemental charter in 1895 allowing women to receive degrees of the university, the Women's Hostel (St Mary's College from 1919) was founded in 1899.

The federal university, 1909–1963

The Newcastle division of the university, which comprised both Armstrong College (named after Lord Armstrong) and Durham University College of Medicine, quickly grew to outnumber the Durham colleges, despite the addition of two independent Anglican foundations: St Chad's College (1904) and St John's College (1909). A parliamentary bill proposed in 1907 would have fixed the seat of the university in Durham for only ten years, allowing the Senate to choose to move to Newcastle after this. This was blocked by a local MP, with the support of graduates of the Durham colleges, until the bill was modified to establish a federal university with its seat fixed in Durham. This reform also removed the university from the authority of the Dean and Chapter of Durham Cathedral, who had been the governors of the university since its foundation. Thirty years after this, the Royal Commission of 1937 recommended changes in the constitution of the federal university, resulting in the merger of the two Newcastle colleges in the Newcastle Division to form King's College. The Vice-Chancellorship alternated between the Warden of the Durham Division and the Rector of the Newcastle Division. (The legacy of this lives on, in that the de facto head of the university is still called "The Vice-Chancellor and Warden".)

After World War II, the Durham division expanded rapidly. St Aidan's Society (St Aidan's College from 1961) was founded in 1947 to cater for non-resident women and the decision was made to expand further on Elvet Hill (where the science site had been established in the 1920s), relocating St Mary's College, building new men's colleges, vastly expanding the existing pure science provision in Durham, and adding applied science (1960) and engineering (1965).

In 1947, the foundation stones for the new St Mary's College building on Elvet Hill were laid by Princess Elizabeth (later Queen Elizabeth II). The new building opened in 1952. In the same year, tensions surfaced again over the Durham-Newcastle divide, with a proposal to change the name of the university to the "University of Durham and Newcastle". This motion was defeated in Convocation (the assembly of members of the university) by 135 votes to 129. Eleven years later, with the Universities of Durham and Newcastle upon Tyne Act 1963, King's College became the University of Newcastle upon Tyne, leaving Durham University based solely in its home city.

The modern university, 1963–1999

By the time of the separation from Newcastle the Elvet Hill site was well established; with the first of the new colleges being founded in 1959, Grey College, named after the second Earl Grey who was the Prime Minister when the university was founded. Expansion up Elvet Hill continued, with Van Mildert College and the Durham Business School (1965), Trevelyan College (1966), and Collingwood College (1972) all being added to the university, along with a Botanic Garden (1970).

These were not the only developments in the university, however. The Graduate Society, catering for postgraduate students, was founded in 1965 (renamed Ustinov College in 2003) and the (now closed) Roman Catholic seminary of Ushaw College, which had been in Durham since 1808, was licensed as a hall of residence in 1968. In 1988 Hatfield, the last men's college, became mixed; followed by the women's college of Trevelyan in 1992, leaving the original women's college of St Mary's as the last single-sex college.

In 1989 the university started its fund-raising and alumni office, with a virtual community for alumni and several large gifts made to the university, including for the Centre for Middle Eastern Studies, the Department of Physics and the Wolfson Research Institute.

Development in Stockton, 1992–1999

In 1991, a joint venture between the university and the University of Teesside saw the Joint University College on Teesside of the Universities of Durham and Teesside (JUCOT) established at Thornaby-on-Tees in the borough of Stockton-on-Tees and the ceremonial county of North Yorkshire,  to the south of Durham. It opened under the name of University College Stockton (UCS) in 1992.

UCS was initially intended to grant joint degrees validated by both institutions (BAs and BScs). However, Teesside, which had only become a university in 1992, had difficulties in taking on its responsibilities for the college and withdrew in 1994, Durham taking over full responsibility for UCS and the degrees to be awarded there.

A programme of integration with Durham began, with the Privy Council approving changes in Durham's statutes to make UCS a college of the University of Durham. Further integration of the Stockton development with the university led to the formation of the University of Durham, Stockton Campus (UDSC) in 1998 and the separation of teaching responsibilities from UCS.

21st century

In 2001, two new colleges, John Snow and George Stephenson (after the physician and the engineer) were established at Stockton, replacing UCS, and the new medical school (operating in association with the University of Newcastle upon Tyne) accepted its first students. In 2002, her golden jubilee year, the Queen granted the title "Queen's Campus" to the Stockton site. By 2005, Queen's Campus, Stockton, accounted for around 18 per cent of the total university student population.

In 2005, the university unveiled a re-branded logotype and introduced the trading name of Durham University, although the legal name of the institution remained the University of Durham and the official coat of arms was unchanged. The same year, St Mary's College had its first mixed undergraduate intake. In October 2006, Josephine Butler College opened its doors to students as Durham's newest college – the first purpose-built self-catering college for students within Durham. This was the first new college to open in Durham itself since the creation of Collingwood in the 1970s.

In May 2010, Durham joined the Matariki Network of Universities (MNU) together with Dartmouth College (USA), Queen's University (Canada), University of Otago (New Zealand), University of Tübingen (Germany), University of Western Australia and Uppsala University (Sweden). In 2012, Durham (along with York, Exeter and Queen Mary, University of London) joined the Russell Group of research-intensive British universities.

Between 2010 and 2012 the university was criticised for accepting funds from controversial sources, including the government of Iran, the US State Department, the prime minister of Kuwait, and British American Tobacco.

Closure of Queen's Campus and expansion in Durham 

The university announced in 2016 that it would relocate the colleges and academic activities currently at the Queen's Campus to Durham City from 2017; with the School of Medicine, Pharmacy and Health being transferred to Newcastle University. The Queen's Campus became an International Study Centre to prepare overseas students to study at Durham, run by Study Group.

In March 2017 Lord Rees opened the Ogden Centre for Fundamental Physics, designed by Daniel Libeskind. The new building, named after alumnus Peter Ogden, provides extra laboratories and office space for 140 staff. In May 2017 the university announced a new ten-year strategy that proposed investing £700m in improving the campus, creating 300 new academic posts, increasing the size of the university to 21,500 students while attracting more international students, and expanding the business school and the departments of law, politics, English and history to reach "critical research mass".

In 2018 the university announced that a consortium led by Interserve would design, build and operate two colleges at Mount Oswald (new buildings for John Snow College and one new college) for £105 million. The project company (in which the university has a 15 per cent stake) is financing the construction via a £90 million 46-year bond issue. Separately, the university announced that it had raised £225 million to fund its estate masterplan through the private sale of long-term bonds to British and US investors. In 2021 it was reported that there was a culture of sexism and bullying at Durham, and that the university had been reluctant to address structural problems, thereby enabling this culture to develop relatively unchallenged.

Campus
This contains part of the Durham Castle and Cathedral UNESCO World Heritage Site and multiple other heritage assets including three ancient monuments (the Maiden Castle Iron Age promontory fort, Cosin's Library and Divinity House), four grade I listed buildings (including Kingsgate Bridge, the Exchequer Building on Palace Green, the gatehouse, keep, north range and west range of Durham Castle, and multiple listings covering surviving sections of the castle walls around the north of the castle and along the top of the river bank behind Hatfield College and St Cuthbert's Society) and 79 grade II or II* listed buildings.  the estate 
The estate also includes the Queen's Campus in Stockton-on-Tees.

The insurance reinstatement value was estimated as close to £850 million in 2014.

Durham City

Durham City is the main location of the university and contains all of the colleges along with most of the academic departments. The Durham City estate is spread across several different sites.

The Bailey is the historic centre of the university and contains five colleges as well as the departments of Music and of Theology and Religion, the Institute of Advanced Study and Palace Green Library, housing the university's special collections. The Bailey is linked to Dunelm House, home of the Students Union in New Elvet, by the university's Kingsgate Bridge.

The Old and New Elvet areas contain a number of departments in Humanities and Social Sciences including Philosophy, and Sociology. The Leazes Road site on the north bank of the Wear, opposite the university's Racecourse playing fields and Old Elvet, is home to the School of Education and Hild Bede College. Old Elvet was previously the site of the university's administration in Old Shire Hall; since September 2012, the administration has been based in the Palatine Centre on the Mountjoy site.

Mountjoy

The Mountjoy site (formerly the Science site) south of New Elvet contains the vast majority of departments and large lecture theatres such as Appleby, Scarborough, James Duff, Heywood and more recently the Calman Learning Centre (opened 2007) and the Teaching and Learning Centre (opened 2019), along with the Bill Bryson library. Upper Mountjoy contains the Psychology and Biological & Biomedical schools, along with various research centres.

Elvet Hill

Elvet Hill, south of the Mountjoy site, has ten of the colleges as well as the Botanic Garden and the Vice-Chancellor's residence in Hollingside House. It is also home to the Business School and the department of Government and International Affairs, as well as the Teikyo University of Japan in Durham and the Oriental Museum.

As part of the transfer of colleges from the Queen's Campus in 2017, a number of colleges changed location. Stephenson College moved to the site at Howlands Farm (also on Elvet Hill) previously occupied by Ustinov College. Ustinov itself moved to a new site at Sheraton Park in Neville's Cross from the 2017/18 academic year. For a transition period, John Snow and Stephenson were both located at Howlands Farm during the 2018/19 academic year.

Mount Oswald

Two new colleges opened in 2020 at the site of the former Mount Oswald golf course on Elvet Hill. John Snow moved into one of these colleges, with the other forming the new South College, the university's 17th college. The new colleges at Mount Oswald have around 500 self-catered rooms each. As of 2016, when bids were solicited for the construction, the first 700 rooms were hoped to be available for the 2019/20 academic year and the remaining 300 by the 2021/22 academic year. Construction began in September 2018, with "Hub building" expected to be ready for 2019/20 but the first students not expected to move into the new accommodation until the 2020/21 academic year. John Snow college moved out of Howlands in 2019/20, and was located for one year at Rushford Court (the former County Hospital, now owned by Unite Students) in the viaduct area of the city before moving to Mount Oswald for 2020/21.

Development plans
The university published a strategy document in 2017 setting out (among other things) a roadmap for development of the estate over the period to 2027, including the development of a new home for the business school at Elvet Waterside (Old Elvet), to open in 2021, the redevelopment of the arts and humanities facilities at Elvet Riverside (New Elvet), opening from 2022, the construction of four to six new colleges, and the continued development of the Mountjoy site.

The plans for New Elvet were contingent on the university being granted a "Certificate of Immunity from Listing" for the current student union building, Dunelm House, which would allow it to be demolished. However, following a recommendation of listing by Historic England and multiple appeals and a multi-year campaign by the Twentieth Century Society against government decisions in 2016 and 2017 not to list the building, Dunelm House was given a Grade II listing in 2021.

Proposals for a £75 million new business school on Elvet Waterside were submitted for planning permission in 2019. However, this had not been granted by 2022. The university instead decided to purchase the Waterside Building, Durham County Council's newly-built headquarters at the Sands, north of the city centre, after the new county leadership (following the 2021 elections) decided to sell it. The purchase went though for £84 million in late 2022

The university's Estate Masterplan for 2017–2027 identified the area around Howlands Farm, the Leazes Road site (Hild Bede College), and the current Business School site as possible locations for new accommodation development (i.e. new colleges). In preparation for redevelopment, a number of departments and facilities were relocated from Leazes Road in 2022, including the Department of Sport and Exercise Sciences, the Institute of Medical Humanities, and the School of Education. Some accommodation at Hild Bede College was also relocated, but plans to close all of the accommodation at the main Hild Bede site were dropped due to high demand for university accommodation.

Accommodation at the main Hild Bede site will continue to be used through 2023–24, with full refurbishment planned to begin in summer 2024. The college will then relocate temporarily to Rushford Court (previously used by John Snow college while the development of their Mount Oswald site was in progress). The university are currently working with Unite Students (the owners of Rushford Court) to develop the facilities normally provided at a college. In the longer term, Rushford Court is planned to become Durham's 18th college.

Ushaw College
Ushaw College, 5 miles west of Durham, is a former Catholic seminary that is a licensed hall of residence of the university. It hosts parts of the Business School and of the Centre for Catholic Studies, with the university having committed to leasing the East Wing until 2027 and to establishing a residential research library at Ushaw. It formerly housed some students from Josephine Butler College, but since summer 2015 the only students at Ushaw are business marketing students. In 2017 the university's Centre for Evaluation and Monitoring, part of the School of Education, moved to Ushaw College and has remained there since its sale to Cambridge University in 2019.

Queen's Campus

Queen's Campus in the borough of Stockton-on-Tees (Thornaby, North Yorkshire) some 30 miles from Durham City. Until 2017–18, the campus was home to around 2,000 full-time students in two colleges (John Snow and Stephenson Colleges) and the Wolfson Research Institute. A bus connects Queen's Campus to Durham City, with a one-way journey usually taking 45 minutes.

The colleges and academic departments were relocated to Durham City (or transferred to Newcastle University in the case of the School of Medicine, Pharmacy and Health) between 2017 and 2018, and the Queen's Campus became an International Study Centre (ISC), run by Study Group. This prepares non-EU foreign students to enter degree courses at the university, with the first students having started in September 2017. The ISC has taken over the former college accommodation on the campus, with the former Stephenson College buildings becoming Endeavour Court and the former John Snow College buildings becoming Infinity House. The ISC also continues to use the privately owned Rialto Court accommodation, which was previously used by the Queen's Campus colleges. The university had said, as part of its 2017–2027 masterplan, that it is continuing to explore other options for the use of the Queen's Campus and will be developing a separate masterplan for the campus.

The Wolfson Research Institute was established at the Queen's Campus in 2001 to conduct and facilitate interdisciplinary research in health and wellbeing.

Libraries

The Durham University Library system holds over 1.5 million printed items. The library was founded in January 1833 at Palace Green with a 160-volume donation by the Bishop of Durham, William Van Mildert. The library operates five branches: Bill Bryson Library (the main library), Leazes Road Library, Queen's Campus Library, Durham University Business School Library and the Palace Green Library, which holds the special and heritage collections.

In 2005, designated status was granted by the Museums, Libraries and Archives Council to two of the special collections: Bishop Cosin's Library on Palace Green (an endowed public library dating from 1669 of which the university is the trustee), which contains medieval manuscripts and over 5,000 printed books, many early, and the Sudan Archive, described by the university as "the pre-eminent archive on the Sudan outside Khartoum". Since the Museums, Libraries and Archives Council was abolished in 2012, the designation scheme has been managed by Arts Council England; the two special collections remain Designated as of July 2016, along with the Durham University Oriental Museum's Egyptian and Chinese collections.

In 2012 the university, together with the British Library and Durham Cathedral, purchased Europe's oldest intact book, the St Cuthbert Gospel, for the nation for £9 million. It is displayed equally in London and Durham, being shown at the university's Palace Green Library for the first time as part of the Lindisfarne Gospels Durham exhibition in 2013.

In addition to the central library system, each College maintains its own library and reading rooms such as the Bettenson, Brewis, Williams and Fenton Libraries of St Chad's College, which contain over 38,000 volumes. Many departments also maintain a library in addition to the subject collections in the central and college libraries. Readers are also entitled to use the theology library housed by Durham Cathedral in its cloister.

In February 2017, the university announced a £2 million investment to establish a residential research library at Ushaw College. This would be the first residential research library at a UK university, and would offer researchers access to the collections of Ushaw College and Durham Cathedral as well as the university's special collections at the Palace Green Library. It is planned that visiting researchers would also participate in the public engagement programme at Ushaw.

Museums

The university manages a number of museums. Built in the 1960s, the Durham University Oriental Museum grew predominantly from the acquisitions of the university's former School of Oriental Studies. Initially housed across the university and used as a teaching collection, the size of the collection led to the building of the current museum to house the material. The collection to date contains over 30,000 objects from Asian art to antiquities, covering the Orient and Levant to the Far East and the Indian Sub-continent, with over a third of the collection relating to China. The national importance of the Chinese and Egyptian collections can be seen in the Designated Status from the Museums, Libraries and Archives Council achieved in 2008.

The Durham University Museum of Archaeology moved to Palace Green in 2014, having previously been housed in the Old Fulling Mill on the banks of the Wear. The museum was opened in 1833, being the second university museum in England to allow admittance to the general public. The museum focuses on the heritage of North East England and includes national and international collections spanning the Prehistoric, Ancient Greek, Roman, Anglo-Saxon, Medieval and Post Medieval periods.

Chapels, prayer rooms and other faith resources
There are Anglican chapels at many of the colleges, including the 11th Century Norman Chapel in University College and the art deco chapel in Hild Bede College.
There are also multi-faith rooms at St Aidan's College, Trevelyan College, and in the hub building shared by John Snow and South colleges. Muslim prayer rooms are located in Old Elvet and at Grey College. There is a kosher kitchen in St Aidan's College which supports Jewish Sabbath meals and other festivals.

Organisation and administration

Academic year
The academic year at Durham is divided into three terms: Michaelmas term, which lasts 10 weeks from October to December; Epiphany term, which lasts ten weeks from January to March; and Easter term, which lasts nine weeks from April to June. All terms start on a Monday. The weeks of term are called "Teaching Weeks", numbered from 1 (start of Michaelmas) to 29 (end of Easter), although this period is used for teaching and exams. Additionally, there is an "Induction Week" (informally known as "Freshers' Week" or Week 0) for first year students prior to the start of Michaelmas term, starting on the first Monday in October.

Students at the university are also expected to "Keep Term", whereby students must fulfil their academic requirements at the university. As such Heads of Departments must be satisfied that each student has attended all necessary tutorials, seminars and practical work throughout the term and vacation period.

Colleges

Durham operates a collegiate structure similar to that of the University of Oxford and the University of Cambridge, in that all the colleges at Durham (and the Wesley Study Centre) are "listed bodies" in part two of the Education (Listed Bodies) (England) Order 2013 made under the Education Reform Act 1988, as bodies that appear to the Secretary of State "to be a constituent college, school, hall or other institution of a university which is such a recognised body" (the "recognised body" being, in this case, Durham University). Though most of the Durham colleges are governed and owned directly by the university itself (the exceptions being St John's and St Chad's), the legal status of the Durham colleges is similar to Oxbridge colleges, setting them apart from those at the universities of Kent, Lancaster, and York. However, unlike at Oxford and Cambridge, there is no formal teaching at Durham colleges (with the exception of Cranmer Hall theological college within St John's), although colleges are active in research. The colleges dominate the residential, social, sporting, and pastoral functions within the university, and there is heavy student involvement in their operation.

Formal dinners (known as "formals") are held at every college; gowns are worn to these events at just over half of the colleges. Gowns are not worn for formals at Collingwood, St Aidan's, St Cuthbert's, Hild Bede, Van Mildert, Stephenson or Ustinov. There is a great deal of intercollegiate rivalry, particularly in rowing and other sporting activities. There is also rivalry between the generally older "Bailey" colleges and the newer "Hill" colleges.

The colleges are:

Governance

The university is governed by the statutes put in place by the Universities of Durham and Newcastle upon Tyne Act, 1963, and subsequently amended by the Privy Council. The statutes provide that: "The University shall be governed by a Visitor, Chancellor, Vice-Chancellor, Convocation, Council, Senate, and Boards of Studies." (Statute 4).

The visitor of the university is the Bishop of Durham. The visitor is the final arbiter of any dispute within the university, except in those areas where legislation has removed this to the law courts or other ombudsmen, or in matters internal to the two non-maintained colleges (St Chad's College and St John's College), each of which has its own visitor. Student complaints and appeals were heard by the visitor until the Higher Education Act 2004 came into force. All student complaints are now heard by the Office of the Independent Adjudicator.

The chancellor of the university  will be Fiona Hill from summer 2023, who was appointed in November 2022 in succession to Sir Thomas Allen. The chancellor is appointed by convocation for "a fixed period of not normally less than five years as determined by the Council", which can be renewed. The role of the chancellor is mainly ceremonial; The Vice-Chancellor and Warden is the chief executive officer of the university and is appointed by council after consultation with senate. As warden, the vice-chancellor is responsible for the 15 maintained colleges of the university. Since January 2022 this has been Karen O'Brien, the University's first female Vice-Chancellor and Warden, succeeding Stuart Corbridge who retired in July 2021.

Convocation is the assembly of the university. Membership of convocation includes the chancellor, vice-chancellor, deputy vice-chancellor and pro-vice-chancellors, all graduates, the teaching staff (lecturers, senior lecturers, readers, and professors), and the heads of colleges and licensed halls of residence. It must meet once each year in order to hear the Vice-Chancellor's Address and to debate any business relating to the university. Further meetings can be called if representation is made by a minimum of 50 members. Its powers are limited to appointing the chancellor (on the nomination of council and senate) and the making of representations to the university on any business debated (statute 30).

Council is the executive body of the university. In addition to representatives from the university it includes up to 12 lay members (not being teachers or salaried staff in the university or any of its colleges), the Dean of Durham and the President of Durham Students' Union (Statute 10). Its powers include establishing and maintaining colleges, and recognising non-maintained colleges and licensed halls of residence (statutes 12 & 13).

Senate is the supreme governing body of the university in academic matters. It has the right to be consulted by Council on the appointment of the Vice-Chancellor and Warden, the deputy vice-chancellor and the pro-vice-chancellors, and recommends the establishment of Faculties and Boards of Studies (academic departments). It is Senate that grants degrees, and has the authority to revoke them. It also regulates the use of academic dress of the university (statutes 19 & 20).

The academic electoral assembly consists of all members of academic staff, except those who are ex-officio members of senate, and the senior tutors of St John's College and At Chad's College. In addition to electing members of senate, it has its own chair and standing committee and may discuss "Any matter of interest to the University" and make recommendations to senate, council or both (statute 24).

The day-to-day running of the university is in the hands of the University Executive Committee (UEC), which is also responsible for the development of the policies and strategies. This is a joint subcommittee of Senate and Council and consists of the Vice-Chancellor and Warden, the Deputy Vice-Chancellor and Provost (Chief Academic Officer), the five pro-vice-chancellors (Colleges and Student Experience; Education; Equality, Diversity and Inclusion; Global; and Research , the executive deans of the four faculties, the chief financial officer, the chief information officer, the university secretary, and the directors of four support divisions (Estates and Facilities; Human Resources and Organisational Development; Strategy Delivery; and Advancement, Marketing and Communications). All heads of departments and of colleges report directly to one of the members of the UEC.

Departments and faculties
The teaching departments of the university are divided into four faculties: Science, Arts and Humanities, Social Sciences and Health, and the Business School. Each faculty is headed by an executive dean and one or more deputies. These, along with the heads of the departments in the faculty and the vice-chancellor, make up the Faculty Board for that faculty. Each department also has a Board of Studies consisting of the executive dean of their faculty, the teaching staff of the department, and student representatives (statute 29). Associated with the first three faculties are three combined honours degrees: Natural Sciences (BSc and MSci), Liberal Arts (BA), and Combined Honours in Social Sciences (BA).

The largest degree programmes offered by the university, by number of entrants from the 2013–14 admissions cycle, were Business, Accounting and Finance (395), Natural Sciences (221), Modern Languages and Cultures (216), and Geography (216).

Faculty of Social Sciences & Health
 Department of Anthropology
 Department of Archaeology
 School of Education
 Department of Geography
 School of Government and International Affairs  (Including the Politics Department and the Institute for Middle East and Islamic Studies)
 Durham Law School
 Department of Sociology
Department of Sport and Exercise Sciences

Faculty of Arts and Humanities
Department of Classics & Ancient History
Department of English Studies
Department of History
School of Modern Languages and Cultures  (Includes Arabic, Chinese, Japanese, French, German, Italian, Russian, and Hispanic Studies Departments)
 Department of Music
Department of Philosophy
Department of Theology and Religion
English Language Centre
Centre for Foreign Language Study

Faculty of Science
Department of Biosciences
Department of Chemistry
Department of Computer Science
Department of Earth Sciences
Department of Engineering
Department of Mathematical Sciences
Department of Physics
Department of Psychology

Faculty of Business (Durham University Business School)
Department of Accounting
Department of Economics and Finance
Department of Management and Marketing

Academic profile

Research

The university is part of the Russell Group, Virgo Consortium and the N8 Group of Universities.
According to the latest CWTS Leiden Ranking 2018 that measures the scientific performance of 500 major universities worldwide, Durham is ranked 89th in the world in terms of the proportion of its academic papers in the top 10 per cent for impact (the "PP(top 10%)" measure).

Research institutes at the university include the Centre for the Advanced Study of the Arab World, the Durham Energy Institute, the Institute for Hazard and Risk Research, the Institute of Advanced Study, the International Boundaries Research Unit and the Institute for Computational Cosmology.

In the 2014 Research Excellence Framework, Durham was assessed to have a research profile of 33 per cent world class (4*), 50 per cent internationally important (3*), 15 per cent internationally recognised (2*), and 1 per cent nationally recognised (1*). which was an improvement on the 2008 Research Assessment Exercise. However, this was in the context of a rise in the average profile from 2008 to 2015. In the Times Higher Education ranking by grade point average (GPA; measuring average quality), Durham fell from joint 14th in 2008 to 20th in 2014 despite a rise in GPA from 2.72 to 3.14. Similarly, Durham fell from 19th to 20th in the Times Higher Education ranking by total research power. However, in Research Fortnight's ranking by total research power (which uses a weighting closer to that used by HEFCE in making funding allocations, with 2* and 1* research zero-weighted) Durham rose from 19th in 2008 to 18th in 2014.

Reputation and rankings

Durham University's Strategic Plan 2017–2027 defines targets of being in the top 5 nationally on the Times/Sunday Times league table, of having 50 per cent of eligible subjects in the top 50 globally on the QS world rankings, and of being in the top three UK institutions by citations per academic staff member.

The earlier 2010–2020 strategic plan called for it "to be in the top 5 universities in major UK league tables" (defined as the Times/Sunday Times Good University Guide and the Complete University Guide) and "to be in the top 50 universities in the Times Higher Education world rankings by 2020". The first objective was met in 2012 and 2015, the second remains as yet unmet, with Durham ranking 70th in the world in 2015. The previous 2005–2010 strategic plan called for Durham "to be ranked among the top 30 universities in Europe and the top 100 in the world in the Times Higher Education Supplement international league tables"; Durham ranked 85th in the world (19th in Europe) in 2010 and has since maintained its position in the top 100.

National
Durham consistently places in the top ten in rankings of universities in the United Kingdom and is one of only four universities (along with Oxford, Cambridge, and St Andrews) to have never left the top 10 in any of the three main domestic league tables since 2013. The 2018 Complete University Guide ranks Durham 6th overall, The Guardian University Guide 2018 ranks Durham 4th overall and the 2018 The Times/Sunday Times Good University Guide ranks Durham 5th overall.

Subject

In the 2020 Complete University Guide subject rankings, Durham is top in the UK for English and Music. The university ranks second for French, Geography & Environmental Science, Iberian Languages, Middle Eastern & African Studies, and Theology & Religious Studies. Third for Archaeology, Chemistry, Classics & Ancient History, German, History, Italian, and Russian & East European Languages. With 30/33 subjects ranked in the top 10, Durham is one of only four universities (along with Oxford, Cambridge, and Imperial College London) to have over 90 per cent of their subjects in the top 10 in this ranking.

In The Guardian 2018 subject rankings Durham ranks first in Archaeology, second in Education, and third in Chemistry, Earth Sciences, English, Geography & Environmental Studies, and Religious Studies & Theology.

In the 2018 The Times/Sunday Times Good University Guide subject rankings, Durham is top in music and joint top in English. It also ranks second in archaeology and forensic science, East and South Asian studies, geography and environmental science, history, Iberian languages, Italian, and theology and religious studies; joint second in Russian and East European languages: and third in chemistry and education.

International
Durham has been placed in the top 100 universities in the world in both the Times Higher Education (THE) and Quacquarelli Symonds (QS) rankings since 2010.

The Times Higher Education World University Rankings for 2017 place Durham 96th in the world (12th in the UK) in 2016, down from 70th in 2015. In the individual subject area rankings for 2016–7, Durham is placed 60th (2015-6: 83rd) in the world (8th in the UK) for physical sciences, 60th (2015-6: 36th) in the world (9th in the UK) for social sciences, and 29th (2015-6: 28th)in the world (6th in the UK) for arts and humanities. Durham is not ranked on the other top-100 subject tables (business and economics; computer science; engineering and technology; life sciences; clinical, pre-clinical and health). Durham re-entered the Times Higher Education World Reputation Rankings in the 91–100 band in 2017, having not been ranked in the top 100 in 2016.

The QS World University Rankings 2018 places Durham 78th in the world (12th in the UK), down from 74th in 2016/2017 and 61st in 2015 – the fall experienced by many UK universities in the rankings has been attributed to uncertainty over Brexit. In the "faculty" subject areas for 2017, Durham ranks 45th in the world (9th in the UK) for arts and humanities, 242nd in the world (26th in the UK) for engineering and technology, 368th in the world (31st in the UK) for life sciences and medicine, 72nd in the world (8th in the UK) for natural sciences, and 98th in the world (13th in the UK) for social sciences and management. In the subject rankings for 2017, Durham was ranked 3rd in the world for theology, divinity and religious studies, 4th for archaeology and 7th for geography. Earth and marine sciences (24th), anthropology (35th), English language and literature (35th), history (37th) and law and legal studies (40th) also featured in the top 50 in the world, while Durham also ranked in the top 100 for chemistry, modern languages, physics and astronomy, politics, psychology, and sociology. One of Durham's 2017–2027 strategic goals is to have half of its subjects in the top 50 globally on the QS ranking; in 2017 it had 8 in the top 50 out of 27 subjects ranked (30 per cent). Another 2017–2027 strategic goal is for Durham to be in the top three universities in the UK for research citations per faculty; the QS ranking 2018 placed Durham fourth in the UK (82nd globally) for this measure, behind the London Business School, Cambridge and Oxford, slipping from second in the UK (43rd globally) in 2017.

The Shanghai Academic Ranking of World Universities placed Durham in the 201–300 bracket. In individual subject areas, Durham is placed in the 51–75 bracket for science and the 101–150 bracket for social science, it is not ranked in engineering, life sciences or medical sciences. In individual subjects, the ARWU places Durham 27th in the world (5th in the UK) for physics, and gives no rank for chemistry, mathematics, computer science, or economics/business.

The CWTS Leiden Ranking, based on bibliometric indicators of research, placed Durham 89th in the world (16th in the UK) in 2018. In scientific subject areas, Durham ranked 251st in the world (35th in the UK) for biomedical and health science, 104th in the world (26th in the UK) for life and earth sciences, 389th in the world (36th in the UK) for mathematics and computer science, 76th in the world (10th in the UK) for physical sciences and engineering, and 69th in the world (11th in the UK) in social sciences and humanities.

The Round University Ranking placed Durham 94th in the world (12th in the UK) in 2016. In certain subject areas, Durham ranked 30th in the world (8th in the UK) for the humanities, 44th in the world (12th in the UK) for social sciences, 153rd in the world (27th in the UK) for technical sciences, 191st in the world (21st in the UK) for natural sciences, 269th in the world (33rd in the UK) for life sciences and 418th in the world (61st in the UK) for medical sciences.

Employment
In 2017, Durham had the highest graduate employment rate of any UK university, with 97.9 per cent of its graduates in work or further study three and a half years after graduation. In 2015, Durham was placed 47th in the world (8th in the UK) in QS's pilot global employability ranking, and 8th in the UK for graduate prospects by the Times and Sunday Times 2016. It did not, however, feature in the Times Higher Education Top 150 Global Employability rankings, but was placed joint 16th in the UK for the employability of its graduates according to recruiters of the UK's major companies. The High Fliers Research UK graduate market report for 2016 placed Durham 8th in its table of universities targeted by the largest number of top employees.

Other indications
In 2013, Durham was judged to have the best quality of student life in the country in the inaugural Lloyds Bank rankings and has never (in 2015) been out of the top three, coming in third in 2014 and second in 2015.
The Complete University Guide ranked Durham as the 29th safest university in England and Wales for crime in 2016, although with large differences between the two campuses: Durham City had 24.4 incidents per 1000 residents while the Queen's Campus in Stockton had 56.0 incidents per 1000 residents.

Durham is one of the few universities to have won University Challenge more than once (1977 and 2000).

Admissions

The average UCAS point score for new entrants in 2020–21 was 187 points, placing Durham University tenth in the country in terms of entrants' points. Durham's student body consists of  undergraduates and  postgraduate students. In 2014/15, Durham had the fourth highest number of students from middle-class backgrounds at 85.8 per cent. For the same year, 34.3 per cent of the undergraduate full-time student population came from independent schools and 8.75% from grammar schools, 19.35 per cent of full-time students are of ethnic minorities. In 2014–15, 44.8 per cent of full-time undergraduate students lived in University (including St John's and St Chad's colleges) accommodation. The university gave offers of admission to 69 per cent of 18-year-old applicants in 2015, the 9th lowest amongst the Russell Group. In the 2016–17 academic year, the university had a domicile breakdown of 73:6:22 of UK:EU:non-EU students respectively with a female to male ratio of 55:45.

Durham charges undergraduate fees of £9,250 for home/EU students. Following the Government's announcement in 2016 that fees in England would be allowed to rise by 2.8 per cent (from the then maximum level of £9,000), Durham became one of the first universities in the country to announce it intended to take advantage of this to raise fees to the new maximum of £9,250 for students entering from 2017.

For the undergraduate admissions cycle 2013–14, Durham received 26,030 applications (for around 4,200 places), of which 38.4 per cent were from independent schools and 13.8 per cent (of UK applications) from ethnic minorities, overall 64.2 per cent of applicants were successful in receiving an offer of admissions. Durham requires students applying for degrees in law to sit the LNAT admission test.

Durham is listed as part of the Sutton Trust 30 "most highly selective" British universities.

Widening access

Durham was criticised in 2017 for not accepting as many students from low participation neighbourhoods, and from state schools, as might be expected from its admission standards and course offerings. For admissions in 2015/16 (the data published in 2017 that sparked the criticism), Durham had the third lowest percentage of state school students (among higher education institutions with over 1,000 full-time first-degree entrants) at 60.5 per cent, compared to a Higher Education Statistics Agency benchmark of 75 per cent. According to pro-vice-chancellor, Alan Hudson, this was a temporary drop from the 63 per cent level the university has reached in recent years, and to which it was expected to return in 2016/17. The university also fell short of its benchmark for admissions from low participation neighbourhoods, accepting 5.1 per cent, compared to a benchmark of 6 per cent. The data for 2016/17 showed that admissions from state schools had recovered to 62.9 per cent, still short of the location-adjusted benchmark of 74.9 per cent, and that admissions from low participation neighbourhoods were 5.2 per cent compared to the location-adjusted benchmark of 6.6 per cent.

Since 1992 the university has run a widening access programme, originally called the Centre for Lifelong Learning and now known as the Durham Centre for Academic Development. The centre provides access to Durham degrees for mature students who show academic promise but do not hold the traditional entry requirements. The centre runs a range of foundation year courses associated with specific degree courses. For the 2013–14 admissions cycle, 153 students took up offers of places in the programme.

Durham has partnered with the Sutton Trust since 2012 to run the Durham University Sutton Trust Summer School for gifted and talented school children from underrepresented backgrounds, leading to qualification with 16 to 32 UCAS Tariff points and a guaranteed conditional offer from Durham if they choose to apply. The university also runs the Durham International Summer School and partners with the Sutton Trust to run the Durham Teacher Summer School.

In 2014, Durham became the first UK university to participate in the Inside-Out Prison Exchange Program. The scheme, where students study alongside inmates, ran in Durham Prison and the high-security Frankland Prison in 2015 and was expanded to include Low Newton Prison in 2016.

Durham gives a bursary, known as the Durham Grant, of £2,000 per year to students from households with an annual income of less than £25,000. The university planned to reduce this to £1,800 per year for students entering from 2016 onwards, after the Office for Fair Access encouraged moving away from bursaries to other schemes to widen participation. However, this decision was reversed after the government decided to abolish maintenance grants. The university also runs the "Supported Progression" programme for sixth-form students, aimed at helping talented young people from the North East, Cumbria and Yorkshire to fulfill their potential via a two-year structured programme of events.

For UK domiciled young full-time undergraduate entrants in 2020/21, 61.6% came from state schools, significantly below the location-adjusted benchmark of 78.5%, and 7.6% came from low participation neighbourhoods, not significantly different from the location-adjusted benchmark of 8.0%. For UK-domiciled undergraduate entrants in 2022/23, UCAS data shows no significant difference in offer rate with gender, a statistically significantly higher offer rate for Black and Asian applicants coupled with a significantly lower offer rate for white applicants,
and a statistically significantly higher offer rate for applicants from the 80% of neighbourhoods with the lowest rates of participation in higher education coupled with a significantly lower offer rate for applicants from the 20% of neighbourhoods with the highest rates of participation in higher education.

Student life

Residential life

Durham students belong to a college for the duration of their time at the university. Most students live in their college for the first year of their undergraduate life, then choose to 'live-out' in their second year, and subsequently have the option of moving back into college for their final year, usually via a ballot system. The Colleges provide a key role in the pastoral care and social centre of students with each running a college tutorial system, along with JCRs providing events and societies for undergraduate members, MCRs being a centre for postgraduate students and the SCRs for the college officers, fellows and tutors. These common rooms are run by an executive committee, usually headed by a President. Some colleges use other titles for the head of their JCR: Hatfield retains "Senior Man", having rejected a motion to move to "JCR President" in May 2014 and a motion to allow the incumbent to choose between "Senior Man", "Senior Woman" or "Senior Student" in January 2016. University College voted to allow "Senior Man", "Senior Woman" or "Senior Student" in June 2015, the incumbent switching to using "Senior Student", and St Chad's uses "Senior Man" or "Senior Woman".

Each college has a unique identity and a variety of facilities for students ranging from computer rooms and libraries to tennis courts and gyms. In 2015, Durham University was voted number 1 in the UK for best university WiFi, on the review platform StudentCrowd. Most colleges have their own sports teams and compete in the collegiate leagues (such as Durham College Rowing) and have their own theatre company and orchestra which operate parallel to the university level sports teams and organisations.

Student organisations

Approximately 200 student clubs and organisations run on Durham's campuses, covering academic, arts, culture and faith, hobbies and games, outdoors, politics, law and music interests. Durham Students' Union (DSU) charters and provides most of the funding for these organisations. The DSU runs a Comedy Café, Fresher's Ball, Silent Discos and Vintage fashion fair. The Durham Union Society, founded in 1842 as Durham's Student Debating & Union Society, claims to be the largest independent student society in Durham, and hosts weekly debates and addresses from invited guests. It is supported by both local and corporate sponsors, including Penguin Books, Teach First and the Magic Circle law firm Slaughter and May. The Durham University History Society is the oldest academic society at the university, founded in 1926.

There has been past speculation on the prevalence of socially elitist so-called secret societies on campus, with the 'Hatfield Cavaliers', 'Castle Fives', 'Red Poet Society', 'Elephant Polo Club', and the 'Caelians' named as examples of supposedly active groups in student articles. Most have an all-male membership, though the 'Aolian Society' (named after the Greek God of Wind), said to be based almost exclusively around students from University College, is an apparent exception. Such societies, like 'A.A.' or, in full, Arcanum Arcanorum, are said to have memberships dominated by the Bailey colleges. Alumni dinners for former members of these societies have been held at London clubs.

Diversity 

BAME (Black, Asian, Minority and Ethnic) students make up 32.6% of full-time Durham students in 2019/20, although students who classify themselves as 'black' number only 382 out of 18,430 full-time students (2.07%). According to a 2018 article for the youth news site The Tab, the low representation of black students means that support structures for many young, vulnerable, black students are non-existent.

Incidents of racism, sexism and elitism have been reported as occurring at Durham University. The university has stated that they condemn all racism and hate crime. The university established an independent commission on Respect, Values and Behaviours in October 2018. The report of this commission was published in July 2020, highlighting that there were multiple problems with bullying, discrimination and a lack of diversity, and that many students came to the university with a "sense of entitlement". The report also found that the lack of diversity was "at the root of a number of discriminatory and exclusionary behaviours", including racism, sexism, and disrespect of working class students. The commission made 20 recommendations, all of which were accepted by the university's management.

Civic engagement

Durham University Student Volunteering and Outreach (DUSVO; formally Student Community Action – SCA) oversees over 80 volunteer projects in Durham and the surrounding area, involving more than 2,000 students each year. It was awarded the Queen's Award for Voluntary Service – the UK's highest honour for volunteer groups – in 2020. Colleges often organise their own outreach and charitable activities.

Durham University Charity Kommittee (or DUCK) is the university's equivalent of student's rag week. Originally set up as a week event, DUCK has become a permanent feature in raising money for local or national charities with events taking place throughout the year. Activities take place within each college, as well as centrally over the university. DUCK also organises expeditions to the Himalayas, Jordan and Mount Kilimanjaro to raise money as well as being involved in the university-run 'Project Sri Lanka' and 'Project Thailand'.

Team Durham Community Outreach is a sports community programme aimed at giving support and opportunities through the use of sport. The programme runs projects such as Summer Camps for children from the Youth Engagement Service and fostered backgrounds along with providing coaching at local schools as well as participating in sports in action.

Town and gown relations

The relationship between the university and the wider city has not always been free of tension. University plans for expansion have also faced local opposition.

Student media
Palatinate, Durham's independent student run fortnightly newspaper, has been continually published since 1948. Notable former editors include George Alagiah, Hunter Davies, Piers Merchant, Sir Timothy Laurence, Jeremy Vine and Harold Evans.

Purple Radio is Durham's student radio station. It broadcasts live from the DSU 24 hours a day during term time. The station has existed since the 1980s and is a recognised DSU society. Two daily news bulletins are broadcast every weekday, as well as a Breakfast Show and an Evening Show.

The Bubble, founded in 2010, is an online magazine based at the university covering various subjects, including student and university news.

Sport

Sport at Durham is a key aspect of student life with some 92 per cent of students regularly taking part. As of 2018, the university caters for more than 50 different sports, organised under the umbrella name of Team Durham, with many being predominantly based at the Graham Sports Centre at Maiden Castle. This facility has 26 courts and pitches for sports ranging from rugby to lacrosse to netball, additional facilities include eleven boat houses and two astroturfs, a fitness studio, and a weights room. The university also owns The Racecourse which has a further eight courts and pitches for cricket, rugby (union and league), squash and football.

The university is recognised as a Centre of Cricketing Excellence (one of only six university centres to play first-class matches) by the England and Wales Cricket Board. The university also has Performance Centres for rowing, lacrosse, tennis and fencing.

Durham has been 2nd across all sports in the British Universities & Colleges Sport (BUCS) table since 2011/12. In 2014/15 it became only the second University (after Loughborough) to pass 4000 BUCS points and the top university in the country for team sports. Both of these were repeated in 2015/16, which also saw Durham beat its own records for total BUCS scores in League and Cup competitions.

In rowing, it has a good record at the BUCS Regatta, having won the title for ten consecutive years (2004–2013) before coming second in 2014, then regaining the title in 2015 before losing it again in 2016. In 2017 the club finished in 7th place, from 52 ranked teams. Durham University Boat Club also competes in Durham Regatta and the Boat Race of the North against Newcastle University, which ran 1997 – 2010 and was revived in 2015. In Women's and Men's lawn tennis, Team Durham's 1st teams have done well at the BUCS Championship, with the Women's team winning the Championship in 2011 & 2017 and the Men's team winning 4 straight Championships from 2014 to 2018.

Durham University is one of four universities to compete in the unofficial "Doxbridge" Tournament in Dublin, a sporting competition between Durham University, the University of Oxford, the University of Cambridge and the University of York. Durham colleges also compete officially with colleges from the University of York in the annual College Varsity tournament held since 2014. Durham won this tournament in 2014 (in York) and 2015 (in Durham) before York recorded their first victory in 2016 (in York). Durham also competes again long-standing BUCS champions Loughborough University in the 'BUCS Varsity', a coordinated set of BUCS matches across multiple sports, and in a competition between Durham colleges and Loughborough halls of residence, both of which were organised for the first time in 2015/16. Durham won the BUCS Varsity both home and away in 2015/16 but lost the colleges' competition, held in Durham.

Palatinates (named after the colour associated with the university) are given to athletes who demonstrate a high standard (such as international representation) in their sport. It is similar to a blue awarded at other British universities, though the criteria are stricter, and earning a full palatinate has been described by the university as a 'notoriously difficult' achievement. In 2020 just 18 student athletes received the full award, with a further 56 earning a half-palatinate.

Music and drama

The central body for theatre at the university is known as Durham Student Theatre (DST), with around 700 active student members throughout 27 separate, student-run theatre societies as of 2018. The Assembly Rooms is the university-owned theatre, located on The Bailey, which hosts a number of student productions each term. Alongside this, student drama productions are held at Durham City's Gala Theatre (notably Durham University Light Opera Group (DULOG) and Durham Opera Ensemble (DOE), which both perform one show in the Gala every year in Epiphany term), venues around Durham University and within the colleges, Durham Castle, Durham Cathedral, as well as in national and international venues and the Edinburgh Fringe Festival.

Since 1975, the university has played host to the Durham Drama Festival which celebrates new theatrical and dramatic material written by Durham students.

The Durham Revue is the university's sketch comedy group. Tracing its roots back to the early 1950s, and known under its current name since 1988, the group consists of six writer-performers (auditioned, interviewed and chosen each Michaelmas Term) and produces a series of shows each year. The group performs annually with Cambridge University's Footlights and Oxford University's The Oxford Revue, as well as at the Edinburgh Fringe Festival.

Music is particularly marked by the Durham University Chamber Choir and Orchestral Societies (including the Palatinate Orchestra). The Durham Cathedral Choir offers choral scholarships to male students, and several of the colleges (University, Hatfield, Hild Bede, St John's, St Chad's, St Cuthbert's, Grey and St Mary's) also offer organ and/or choral scholarships, as does the Catholic Chaplaincy.

Durham is also home to the oldest Gamelan slendro set in the UK with an active community group and an artist in residence. The instruments are currently housed in the Grade II listed Durham University Observatory. Recently a set tuned to peloghas been added meaning that Durham now has a complete Gamelan orchestra. In recent years, the Durham Gamelan Society has performed at several major public events such as the Gong Festivals 2011 & 2012 and at the Gamelan Lokananta all night wayang kulit in celebration of York University's Gamelan Sekar Petak 30th anniversary in 2012, as well as many smaller performances for the International Students' Festival and college events.

Alumni

Societies
Durham alumni are active through organisations and events such as the annual reunions, dinners and balls. By 2007 there were 67 Durham associations ranging from international to college and sports affiliated groups catering for the more than 109,000 living alumni.

The umbrella organisation for Durham University alumni is Dunelm, which offers a range of events and dedicated alumni services. Dunelm can trace its roots to the Durham University Society, formed in 1921, and preceded by the Society of Dunelmians in 1905 and the Durham University Association in 1866. Dunelm USA, formerly the North American Foundation for the University of Durham or NAFUD, is a philanthropic body in the United States that hosts alumni events and fundraises for Durham-related projects.

A masonic lodge, University of Durham Lodge no. 3030, was founded in 1903 for university alumni and currently meets at Freemasons' Hall in Covent Garden. Alumni also benefit from affiliate membership of the Princeton Club of New York. Durham graduates do not have a dedicated private club themselves – an attempt to raise funds for a central London club (modelled on the Oxford and Cambridge Club) commenced in March 1922, spearheaded by members of the University of Durham Lodge, but was ultimately unsuccessful.

Notable people

A number of Durham alumni have made significant contributions in the fields of government, law, science, academia, business, arts, journalism, and athletics, among others. These have included Justin Welby, Archbishop of Canterbury (St John's, 1992), Sir Milton Margai, first prime minister of Sierra Leone (MD, 1926), the 7th Queensland Premier John Douglas (BA, 1850), Henry Holland, 1st Viscount Knutsford, Secretary of State for the Colonies from 1887 to 1892 (Law, 1847), Herbert Laming, Baron Laming, head of the Harold Shipman inquiry and the investigation of Britain's social services following the death of Baby P, (Applied Social Studies, 1960), Dame Caroline Swift, the lead counsel to the Shipman inquiry, Sultan bin Muhammad Al-Qasimi, ruler of the Emirate of Sharjah (PhD Geography, 1999), and Mo Mowlam, Secretary of State for Northern Ireland at the time of the Good Friday Peace Agreement (Sociology and Anthropology). Durham graduate Libby Lane was the first woman to be consecrated bishop in the Church of England.

Durham graduates also hold noteworthy positions in the law, including Supreme Court Justices Lord Hughes (Law) and Lady Black (Law), the President of the Family Division Sir Andrew McFarlane and former Lord Chancellor Robert Buckland (Law) amongst others.

Within the military graduates include General Richard Dannatt, Baron Dannatt (Economic History), the Chief of the General Staff, the professional head of the British Army, Vice-Admiral Sir Tim Laurence (Geography), Chief Executive of Defence Estates and husband to The Princess Royal, and Rear-Admiral Amjad Hussain (Engineering, 1979) highest-ranking officer from an ethnic minority in the British Armed Forces.

In academia, Durham graduates include John D. Barrow (Mathematics and Physics, 1974), winner of the Templeton Prize, Sir George Malcolm Brown (Chemistry & Geology, 1950), invited by NASA to work on the moon rock samples recovered from the Apollo 11 lunar mission, George Rochester (1926), co-discoverer of the kaon sub-atomic particle, alongside Sir Harold Jeffreys (Mathematics, 1919), winner of the Royal Society's Copley Medal, Sir Kingsley Charles Dunham (Geology 1930) former director of the British Geological Survey and E. J. Field, early discoverer of what are now called prions and significant contributor to MS research. The current Vice-chancellor of the University of Wollongong (Paul Wellings), former Vice-chancellor of Cardiff University (David Grant), and Chris Higgins, former vice-chancellor of Durham, are also graduates.

Several alumni hold top positions in the business world. Richard Adams (Sociology), founder of fair trade organisation Traidcraft, Paul Hawkins (PhD in Artificial Intelligence), inventor of the Hawk-Eye ball-tracking system, Dame Elisabeth Hoodless (Sociology), former Executive Director of Community Service Volunteers, Sir Nick Scheele (German, 1966), former president and chief operating officer of Ford Motor Company, entrepreneur Brenda Lindiwe Mabaso-Chipeio, David Sproxton (Geography, 1976), co-founder of Aardman Animations who produce Wallace & Gromit, Tim Smit (Archaeology and Anthropology), co-founder of the Eden Project and David Walton (Economics and Mathematics, 1984), member of the Bank of England's Monetary Policy Committee.

Prominent journalists and media specialists include: George Entwistle, former Director-General of the BBC, Sir Harold Evans (Politics and Economics), editor of The Sunday Times from 1967 to 1981 and The Times from 1981 to 1982, Nigel Farndale (Philosophy), Sunday Telegraph journalist, George Alagiah (Politics), presenter of the BBC News at Six, Matthew Amroliwala (Law and Politics, 1984), BBC News channel presenter, Biddy Baxter (1955), former producer of Blue Peter, Arthur Bostrom (BA Hons), Officer Crabtree in 'Allo 'Allo!, Nish Kumar (English with History), stand-up comedian, Jamie Campbell (English Literature), filmmaker, Alastair Fothergill (Zoology, 1983), series producer of The Blue Planet, Planet Earth and the director of Earth, Shelagh Fogarty (Modern Languages, 1988), host of the BBC Radio 5 Live breakfast show, Lorraine Heggessey (English Language & Literature), the first female Controller of BBC One and Chris Terrill (Anthropology and Geography), documentary maker, writer and adventurer. Other BBC hosts who have graduated from Durham include Chris Hollins, sports presenter on BBC Breakfast, Gabby Logan (Law, 1995), Kate Silverton (Psychology), Jeremy Vine (English), Tim Willcox (Spanish) and Nina Hossain (English Language and Linguistics).

Noted writers include Edward Bradley author of The Adventures of Mr. Verdant Green, Minette Walters (French, 1971), author of The Sculptress and The Scold's Bridle, Graham Hancock (Sociology, 1973) author of The Sign and the Seal, Tim FitzHigham, comedian and author, James Kirkup, travel writer, poet and playwright, Patrick Tilley, science fiction author, and Lorna Hill (born Lorna Leatham, English, 1926), children's writer, author of the Sadlers Wells series.In the sports realm, former England rugby captains Will Carling (Psychology), Phil de Glanville (Economics), and vice-captain Will Greenwood (Economics, 1994), alongside Olympic gold-medal triple jumper Jonathan Edwards (Physics, 1987), Beijing Olympics Bronze-medallist rower Stephen Rowbotham (Business Economics), London 2012 Gold-medallist rower Sophie Hosking (Chemistry and Physics), former England cricket captains Nasser Hussain (Geochemistry) and Andrew Strauss (Economics) are among the most famous.

In the area of polar exploration, Stephanie Solomonides is the first Cypriot person to reach both the North and the South Poles.

See also
 Armorial of UK universities
 Common Awards
 Historical list of Durham University Colleges
 List of modern universities in Europe (1801–1945)
 List of UK universities

Notes

References

Further reading

 Brickstock, Richard. (2007) Durham Castle: Fortress, Palace, College. Huddersfield: Jeremy Mills Publishing. 
 Fowler, Joseph Thomas (1904), Durham University: Earlier Foundations and Present Colleges, Kessinger Publishing
 Heesom, Alan, (1982) The founding of the University of Durham, Durham Cathedral lecture 1982 (Durham, 1982)
 The Surtees Society, (1853) The Durham University Calendar with Almanack, Durham: W. E. Duncan and Sons 
 Watson, Nigel (2007), Durham Difference: The Story of Durham University, James & James
 Whiting, C.E., (1932) The University of Durham 1832–1932 (London, 1932)

External links

 

 
Durham University
Durham University
Durham University
1832 establishments in England
Buildings and structures in Durham, England
Cross country running venues
Universities UK